Odyssey International  was a charter airline based in Toronto, Ontario, Canada.

History

In June 1988, Odyssey International was founded by Soundair.  Flights began using Boeing 757-28A between Toronto and Las Vegas. Odyssey used the 757s to operate to winter seasonal destinations in the Caribbean and for the summer season Leeds Bradford International Airport and Newcastle in England were served. In order to serve smaller markets, two Boeing 737-3S3 were leased. 

In 1990, the parent company Soundair, was closed causing Odyssey International to cease operations by April 1990.

The Odyssey name, aircraft and some employees were merged with Nationair, and operated as a separate division of Nolisair for a short period of time. Within several months, the Odyssey livery and all references to Odyssey were dropped and employees uniforms changed to those of Nationair, which went bankrupt in 1993.

Fleet

See also 
 List of defunct airlines of Canada

References

Defunct airlines of Canada
Airlines established in 1988
Airlines disestablished in 1990
Canadian companies established in 1988
Canadian companies disestablished in 1990